The Crotty Dam, also known during construction as the King Dam, or the King River Dam on initial approval, is a rockfill embankment dam with a controlled and uncontrolled spillway across the King River, between Mount Jukes and Mount Huxley, located in Western Tasmania, Australia.

The impounded reservoir is called Lake Burbury.

Features and location
The Crotty Dam, together with the Darwin Dam, are two major dams that form the headwaters for the King River Hydroelectric Power Development. The dam is located in the upper reaches of the King River gorge where the river breaks through the West Coast Range.  It captures the high rainfall in the catchment of the King River and allows diversion of water through a tunnel to the John Butters Power Station downstream of the dam.

At 100% capacity the dam wall holds back  (43,000×106 cu ft) of water. The single uncontrolled and controlled spillway is capable of discharging .

Spillway 
A unique feature of the dam is its spillway. The spillway is located on the embankment, rather than on one of the rock abutments. This had never been successfully attempted before in the design of dams of any significant height, due to problems in making allowance for embankment settlements. In the case of Crotty Dam, the embankment was partly composed of well graded gravels, and thus a very high modulus of embankment deformation was achieved. The high modulus limits embankment settlements. Additionally, the spillway was designed to articulate in order to accommodate any settlement that did occur.

The spillway is designed to allow sufficient time for a large jet flow valve located in the diversion tunnel to be opened so that larger floods can be safely handled.

The spillway designers, Sergio Giudici, also the chief engineer on the Gordon Dam, Frank Kinstler, Steven Li, Tony Morse and Graeme Maher were acknowledged within the engineering community because the spillway was the first known to "provide for articulation of the spillway structure so that movements in its foundations could occur without damage to the overlying structure".

Power station

History
The dam was constructed in the 1980s following the abandonment of the Gordon-below-Franklin power development scheme, part of the Franklin Dam. The Crotty Dam was commissioned in 1991, with the King River Power development being completed by 1992.

The dam is named in honour of James Crotty who founded the North Mount Lyell Copper Mine at the turn of the 20th century. A ghost town site of the same name Crotty was submerged by the waters of Lake Burbury.

In the 1910s the Mount Lyell Mining and Railway Company had investigated and surveyed a site very close to this dam for a proposed hydro electric scheme. Charles Whitham also wrote of the inevitability of the dam in 1927 and even proposed "Lake Dorothy" as a name for the reservoir.

In 2001, Engineers Australia selected Crotty Dam as one of the 25 dams with the greatest Australian heritage value. It was awarded a Historic Engineering Marker as part of the Engineering Heritage Recognition Program.

See also

 List of dams in Tasmania

References

Further reading

External links
 Hydro web page on King Catchment

Concrete-face rock-fill dams
Hydro Tasmania dams
Dams completed in 1991
1991 establishments in Australia
King River power development scheme
Recipients of Engineers Australia engineering heritage markers